Andrew McKinnon (born 28 July 1968) is a former Australian rules footballer who played for the Carlton Football Club in the Australian Football League (AFL).

Notes

External links

Andrew McKinnon's profile at Blueseum

1968 births
Carlton Football Club players
Living people
Australian rules footballers from Victoria (Australia)